Mercury selenide (HgSe; sometimes mercury(II) selenide) is a chemical compound of mercury and selenium. It is a grey-black crystalline solid semi-metal with a sphalerite structure. The lattice constant is 0.608 nm.  

HgSe occurs naturally as the mineral Tiemannite, and is a component of the "intimate mixture" of HgSe and Se known as HgSe2.  

Along with other II-VI compounds, colloidal nanocrystals of HgSe can be formed.

Applications
 Selenium is used in filters in some steel plants to remove mercury from exhaust gases. The solid product formed is HgSe.
 HgSe can be used as an ohmic contact to wide-gap II-VI semiconductors such as zinc selenide or zinc oxide.

Toxicity
HgSe is non-toxic as long as it is not ingested due to its insolubility. Toxic hydrogen selenide fumes can be evolved on exposure to acids. HgSe is a relatively stable compound which might mean that it is less toxic than elemental mercury or many organometallic mercury compounds.  Selenium's ability to complex with mercury has been proposed as a reason for the lack of mercury toxicity in deep sea fish despite high mercury levels.

See also
 Mercury sulfide
 Mercury telluride
 Cadmium selenide
 Zinc selenide

References

 
 
 .
 
 SNV (1991) Guidelines on measures and methods for heavy metal emissions control. Solna, The Swedish Environmental Protection Agency – Naturvårdsverket.

External links
 https://web.archive.org/web/20051019034837/http://ctdp.ensmp.fr/species/Tiemannite.html

Mercury(II) compounds
Selenides
Zincblende crystal structure